Halling railway station is on the Medway Valley Line in Kent, England, and lies a little to the north of the village of Halling. The station and all trains that serve the station are operated by Southeastern.

The APTIS-equipped ticket office, in a building on the northbound platform, closed in September 1989; the building, after a lengthy period of disuse, was converted to office accommodation but is again disused.

A PERTIS (Permit to Travel) ticket machine is located just outside the entrance to the station, which is on the northbound platform; this was installed in 2007.

Services

All services at Halling are operated by Southeastern using  EMUs.

The typical off-peak service in trains per hour is:
 2 tph to 
 2 tph to  via 

On Sundays, the service is reduced to hourly in each direction.

References

External links

Borough of Maidstone
Railway stations in Medway
DfT Category F2 stations
Former South Eastern Railway (UK) stations
Railway stations in Great Britain opened in 1890
Railway stations served by Southeastern